Ioannis Katsaidonis (born 4 March 1957) is a Greek weightlifter. He competed at the 1980 Summer Olympics and the 1984 Summer Olympics.

References

1957 births
Living people
Greek male weightlifters
Olympic weightlifters of Greece
Weightlifters at the 1980 Summer Olympics
Weightlifters at the 1984 Summer Olympics
Place of birth missing (living people)
20th-century Greek people